Winlaton Mill is a village in Tyne and Wear, North East England. It is not to be confused with Winlaton to the northwest which now comprises the southern part of Blaydon. The village is halfway between Gateshead to the northeast and Rowlands Gill to the southwest. Statistically Winlaton Mill is part of the ward of Winlaton and High Spen which contains part of Blaydon, High Spen and other outlying villages. The village is on the A694 which joins the A1 at Swalwell and contains the Red Kite Pub and Restaurant. Winlaton Mill is near the River Derwent which may suggest its name.

References

Gateshead
Villages in Tyne and Wear